Clepsis trivia is a species of moth of the family Tortricidae. It is found in Tunisia.

References

Moths described in 1913
Clepsis